Specific absorption rate (SAR) is a measure of the rate at which energy is absorbed per unit mass by a human body when exposed to a radio frequency (RF) electromagnetic field. It can also refer to absorption of other forms of energy by tissue, including ultrasound. It is defined as the power absorbed per mass of tissue and has units of watts per kilogram (W/kg).

SAR is usually averaged either over the whole body, or over a small sample volume (typically 1 g or 10 g of tissue). The value cited is then the maximum level measured in the body part studied over the stated volume or mass.

Calculation 
SAR for electromagnetic energy can be calculated from the electric field within the tissue as:

where
 is the sample electrical conductivity
 is the RMS electric field
 is the sample density
 is the volume of the sample
SAR measures exposure to fields between 100 kHz and 10 GHz (known as radio waves). It is commonly used to measure power absorbed from mobile phones and during MRI scans. The value will depend heavily on the geometry of the part of the body that is exposed to the RF energy, and on the exact location and geometry of the RF source. Thus tests must be made with each specific source, such as a mobile phone model, and at the intended position of use.

Mobile phone SAR testing 

When measuring the SAR due to a mobile phone the phone is placed against a representation of a human head (a "SAR Phantom") in a talk position. The SAR value is then measured at the location that has the highest absorption rate in the entire head, which in the case of a mobile phone is often as close to the phone's antenna as possible. Measurements are made for different positions on both sides of the head and at different frequencies representing the frequency bands at which the device can transmit. Depending on the size and capabilities of the phone, additional testing may also be required to represent usage of the device while placed close to the user's body and/or extremities. Various governments have defined maximum SAR levels for RF energy emitted by mobile devices:

United States: the FCC requires that phones sold have a SAR level at or below 1.6 watts per kilogram (W/kg) taken over the volume containing a mass of 1 gram of tissue that is absorbing the most signal.
European Union: CENELEC specify SAR limits within the EU, following IEC standards. For mobile phones, and other such hand-held devices, the SAR limit is 2 W/kg averaged over the 10 g of tissue absorbing the most signal (IEC 62209-1).
India: switched from the EU limits to the US limits for mobile handsets in 2012. Unlike the US, India will not rely solely on SAR measurements provided by manufacturers; random compliance tests are done by a government-run Telecommunication Engineering Center (TEC) SAR Laboratory on handsets and 10% of towers. All handsets must have a hands free mode.

SAR values are heavily dependent on the size of the averaging volume. Without information about the averaging volume used, comparisons between different measurements cannot be made. Thus, the European 10-gram ratings should be compared among themselves, and the American 1-gram ratings should only be compared among themselves.
To check SAR on your mobile phone, review the documentation provided with the phone, dial *#07# (only works on some models) or visit the manufacturer's website.

MRI scanner SAR testing 
For Magnetic Resonance Imaging the limits (described in IEC 60601-2-33) are slightly more complicated:

Note: Averaging time of 6 minutes.
(a) Local SAR is determined over the mass of 10 g.

(b) The limit scales dynamically with the ratio "exposed patient mass / patient mass":

NORMAL OPERATING MODE: Partial body SAR = 10 W/kg – (8 W/kg * exposed patient mass / patient mass)
FIRST LEVEL CONTROLLED OPERATING MODE: Partial body SAR = 10 W/kg – (6 W/kg * exposed patient mass / patient mass)

(c) In cases where the orbit is in the field of a small local RF transmit coil, care should be taken to ensure that the temperature rise is limited to 1 °C.

Criticism 

SAR limits set by law do not consider that the human body is particularly sensitive to the power peaks or frequencies responsible for the microwave hearing effect. Frey reports that the microwave hearing effect occurs with average power density exposures of 400 μW/cm2, well below SAR limits (as set by government regulations).

Notes:

In comparison to the short term, relatively intensive exposures described above, for long term environmental exposure of the general public there is a limit of 0.08 W/kg averaged over the whole body. A whole-body average SAR of 0.4 W/kg has been chosen as the restriction that provides adequate protection for occupational exposure. An additional safety factor of 5 is introduced for exposure of the public, giving an average whole-body SAR limit of 0.08 W/kg.

FCC advice 
The FCC Guide, "Specific Absorption Rate (SAR) For Cell Phones: What It Means For You," after detailing the limitations of SAR values, offers the following "bottom line" editorial:

MSBE (minimum SAR with biological effect) 
In order to find out possible advantages and the interaction mechanisms of Electromagnetic fields (EMF), the minimum SAR (or intensity) that could have biological effect (MSBE) would be much more valuable in comparison to studying high intensity fields. Such studies can possibly shed light on thresholds of non-ionizing radiation effects and cell capabilities (e.g., oxidative response). In addition, it is more likely to reduce the complexity of the EMF interaction targets in cell cultures by lowering the exposure power, which at least reduces the overall rise in temperature. This parameter might differ regarding the case under study and depends on the physical and biological conditions of the exposed target.

FCC regulations 
The FCC regulations for SAR are contained in 47 C.F.R. 1.1307(b), 1.1310, 2.1091, 2.1093 and also discussed in OET Bulletin No. 56, "Questions and Answers About the Biological Effects and Potential Hazards of Radiofrequency Electromagnetic Fields."

See also 
 Dielectric heating
 Electromagnetic radiation and health

References

External links 
 Specific Absorption Rate (SAR) for Cellular Telephones at the US Federal Communications Commission (FCC)
 "Evaluating Compliance with FCC Guidelines for Human Exposure to Radiofrequency Electromagnetic Field" (Supplement C to OET Bulletin 65), June 2001; a detailed technical document about measuring SAR
 Electromagnetic fields and public health at the World Health Organization (WHO)
 "An Update on SAR Standards and the Basic Requirements for SAR Assessment" at ETS-Lindgren website (Archive.org link), April 2005
 Example of a detailed SAR report from the FCC web site (for an Apple iPod Touch 4th generation); hosted at 3rd party website
 Manufacturers' SAR official websites
 Apple
 Samsung
 Sony
 
 FCC Regulations
 OET Bulletin No. 56, "Questions and Answers About the Biological Effects and Potential Hazards of Radiofrequency Electromagnetic Fields."

Radiobiology
Biophysics
Rates